Astragalus filipes is a species of milkvetch known by the common name basalt milkvetch. It is native to western North America from British Columbia to California to Utah, where it grows in many types of habitat, especially dry areas.

Description
The leaves are up to 12 cm long and made up of several widely spaced leaflets which are linear to oval in shape. The open inflorescence holds up to 30 off-white to pale yellow flowers each 1 to 1.5 cm long.

The fruit is a hanging legume pod up to 3 cm long. It is long and thin and dries to a papery texture.

References

External links

Jepson Manual Treatment - Astragalus filipes
USDA Plants Profile
Astragalus filipes - U.C. Photo gallery

filipes
Flora of the Western United States
Flora of British Columbia
Flora of California
Flora of Nevada
Flora of the Great Basin
Flora without expected TNC conservation status